Rough may refer to:

 Roughness (disambiguation)
 Rough (golf), the area outside the fairway on a golf course

Geography
 Rough (facility), former gas field now gas storage facility, off the Yorkshire coast of England

People
 Alan Rough (born 1951), Scottish football goalkeeper
 Katie Rough (2009–2017), British girl killed by a 15 year old girl
 Peter Rough (born 1983), senior fellow of the conservative US think tank Hudson Institute
 Remi Rough, English street artist
 William Rough (c. 1772 – 1838), English lawyer, judge and poet

Entertainment
 Rough (manga)
 Rough (film), a 2013 film
 Rough (album), released by Tina Turner in 1978
Rough (song), Korean song by GFriend

See also
 Roughs and roughing, in sports, especially in ice hockey
 Roughs, another name for Afghan biscuits in New Zealand